Eastern Orthodox Christianity in Thailand has been represented since 1999 by the Representative Office of the Russian Orthodox Church, including the orthodox parish of Saint Nicolas in Bangkok (Russian Orthodox Church Moscow Patriarchate).

Russian Orthodox church
 
The mission is headed by Father (Archimandrite) Oleg Cherepanin (2008) and serves Russian tourists or citizens in Thailand, local believers of Thai origin and people of other nationalities, including Romanians, Greeks, French.

Besides the main parish of St. Nicholas Cathedral in Bangkok, there are several Russian Orthodox communes including:
 Holy Trinity Church in Phuket 
 All Saints Church in Pattaya
 Protection of Mother of God Church in Pattaya
 Dormition of the Mother of God Monastery in Ratchaburi Province 
 The Holy Ascension Church in Ko Samui, Surat Thani Province
 St. Sergius of Radonezh Church in Ko Chang Trat Province
 St. Vladimir Church in  Chiang Mai
 Holy Royal Martyrs Church in Hua Hin
 St. Seraphim of Sarov in Ko Pha-ngan Surat Thani Province

The mission of Russian Orthodox Church since its establishment translated into Thai language the Divine Liturgy of St. John Chrysostom, the Orthodox Book of prayer and the book about the history of Russian Orthodox Church. In July 2008, the representative office of Russian Orthodox Church was officially registered by Thailand authorities as foundation the Orthodox Christian Church in Thailand.

In November 2007, Father Oleg Cherepanin took part in ecumenical pilgrimage of trust in Bangkok's Assumption Cathedral. Among those present were religious leaders of Roman Catholic Church, Evangelical Lutheran Church of Thailand, Church of Christ in Thailand, Russian Orthodox Church and young people from Laos, Philippines, Hong Kong, Singapore, and Malaysia who came specially for the prayer.

The year 2009 was marked by the visit to Thailand of the Russian Orthodox Church delegation headed by Archbishop Hilarion to celebrate the 10th anniversary of Orthodoxy in the country.

References

External links
Official web-site of Russian Orthodox Christian Church in Thailand